The 2001 NAIA Division II men's basketball tournament  was the tournament held by the NAIA to determine the national champion of men's college basketball among its Division II members in the United States and Canada for the 2000–01 basketball season.

Northwestern (IA) defeated MidAmerica Nazarene in the championship game, 82–78, to claim the Red Raiders' first NAIA national title.

The tournament was played at Keeter Gymnasium on the campus of the College of the Ozarks in Point Lookout, Missouri.

Qualification

The tournament field remained fixed at thirty-two teams, and the top sixteen teams were seeded.

The tournament continued to utilize a single-elimination format.

Bracket

See also
2001 NAIA Division I men's basketball tournament
2001 NCAA Division I men's basketball tournament
2001 NCAA Division II men's basketball tournament
2001 NCAA Division III men's basketball tournament
2001 NAIA Division II women's basketball tournament

References

NAIA
NAIA Men's Basketball Championship
2001 in sports in Missouri